Edison, New Jersey is a township in Middlesex County, New Jersey in central New Jersey. The township was originally founded as the settlement of Piscatawaytown, a small neighborhood that still exists within it, and incorporated as Raritan Township on March 17, 1870.

As of the 2020 United States Census, Edison had a total population of 107,588, making it the sixth-most populous municipality in New Jersey. The township had a total area of 30.638 square miles (79.351 km2).

Edison is crisscrossed by several major roads, including Interstate 287, the New Jersey Turnpike, U.S. Route 1, Route 27, and Route 440, with various sections and neighborhoods interspersed between them. Large acreages of the closed Raritan Arsensal, Camp Kilmer and the Edison Assembly have given way to mixed-use projects.

Some historic settlements date back to the 17th century. Until the later part of the 20th century, the township comprised several rural crossroad communities, the borders of which became less distinct with suburban development. The sprawling township does not have an actual "downtown". A section in the center of Raritan Township was ceded to create the Borough of Metuchen on March 20, 1900. While Metuchen is a separate municipality, it remains fully enclaved by, and is the geographic center of Edison, making Edison a so-called 'doughnut' town.

List of sections and neighborhoods

See also
Edison State Park
Dismal Swamp (New Jersey)
Roosevelt Park (Edison, New Jersey)
List of neighborhoods in Woodbridge Township, New Jersey
Neighborhoods in Perth Amboy, New Jersey
List of neighborhoods in Sayreville, New Jersey

References

Neighborhoods in Edison, New Jersey
E
Neighborhoods